Azienda Trasporti Livornese, known as ATL, was a public company that managed the local public transport in Livorno and its province including Elba.

History

The decision to provide Livorno with a public transport system dates back to 1875 with a horse-drawn tram line. The line was inaugurated on 22 May 1881 and the route, following the course of the sea-promenade, developed from the city center to Ardenza.

On 13 October 1897 the first electric tram was activated and the line started from the San Marco Station to Antignano; at the end of 1906 those with animal traction were definitively replaced by electric tram. On 15 May 1908 was formed a new company and the management passed to the Società Livornese a Trazione Elettrica (SLTE); on 19 August was inaugurated the Montenero funicular in order to connect, lower Montenero to the Sanctuary, placed on the highest part of the hill. In 1930 the tramways network consisted of nine lines and in January 1935 the service was gradually transformed into a trolleybus system.

The Società Trasporti Urbani (STU), a company of the FIAT group, was formed for restructuring the trolleybus service with a fifteen years contract; the program was completed planning eight lines and reducing progressively to two those of the tramways.

The disastrous bombing of Livorno in the Second World War caused extensive damage to the public transport system. After the war a council resolution approved, on 15 October 1949, to entrust the management of the trolleybus network to Azienda Trasporti Autofiloviari Municipale (ATAM) just formed for the occurrence. In 1960 the buses were introduced in service, bringing to a lower use of the trolleybuses to a fewer longest routes. In 1974, because to the oil crisis, the ATAM Board of Directors decided to dismantle the entire trolley system in order to reduce the electric energy consumption.

The ATAM management ended on 31 December 1978 and the following day the urban transport was succeeded by Azienda Consorziale Interprovinciale Trasporti (ACIT), which merged the public transport of Pisa and Livorno. ACIT, being the largest public transport company in Tuscany, revealed enormous structural limitations by borrowing beyond forecasts.
The inevitability financial collapse determined the division of the Company into two separate companies, the Azienda Trasporti Livornese (ATL) in Livorno and the Azienda Pisana Trasporti (APT) in Pisa, starting from 1 April 1987.
ATL tried to meet the new market needs and assumed a more efficient and economical structure  becoming Società per Azioni.

On 21 October 2012 ATL was liquidated and the activities and assets merged into the newly formed Compagnia Toscana Trasporti Nord (CTTNord).

Services
Azienda Trasporti Livornese developed its service not only in the city of Livorno but was extended to the urban services in Cecina, Rosignano Solvay and Elba Island as well as seven suburban lines departing from Livorno through the Province, six from Cecina, one from Collesalvetti and nine from Portoferraio. ATL was granted, by the municipality of Livorno, the management of a considerable number of city parking lots.

Bus fleet
ATL managed the following buses as February 2005.

Livorno bus routes
ATL managed the following routes as February 2005:

Urban bus routes
 1 – Stazione – Carducci – Grande – Ardenza Mare – Antignano Miramare
 2 – Srazione – Garibaldi – Grande – Ardenza Terra – Montenero / Antignano
 3 – Grande – Coteto – Leccia – Scopaia – Collinaia – Monterotondo
 4 – Cimiteri – Grande – Marconi – Ospedale – Colline
 5 – Torretta – Grande – Porto – Mazzini – Stadio – Ardenza Mare
 6 – Cimiteri – Grande - Marradi – La Rosa – Scopaia
 7 – Stazione – Artigianato - Cigna – Stazione
 8N – Stazione – Ospedale - Grande – XI Maggio – Stazione
 8R – Stazione – XI Maggio – Grande – Ospedale – Stazione
 9 – Shangay – Cimiteri – Stazione – Ospedale – Coteto – Ardenza Mare
 10 – Stagno – Pisana – Garibaldi – Grande
 12 – Grande – Ospedale – Salviano – Valle Benedetta – Colognole
 14 – La Rosa – Ardenza Terra – Castellaccio
 15 – Grande – Ospedale – Le Sughere – Scopaia – La Leccia
 AMB – Stazione – Carducci – Grande – Marradi – La Rosa
 G – Grande – Montebello – Ardenza Mare – Montenero
 SPI – Stazione – Via Enriques

Electric Minibus Routes
These routes have been operated by electric Minibus 
 PB1 – Stazione Marittima – Cavour – Amedeo – Grande – Stazione Marittima 
 PB2 – Stazione Marittima – Cappuccini – Cavour – Stazione Marittima 
 PB3 – Stazione Marittima – Venezia – Grande – Mercati – Stazione Marittima

Night Bus Routes
 A – Stazione – Carducci – Grande – Ardenza Mare – Ardenza Terra – Garibaldi – Stazione
 B – Stazione – Garibaldi – Grande – Marradi - Ardenza Terra – Ardenza Mare – Grande – Carducci – Stazione

School Service
 C – Scuola Media Michelangelo 
 LV – Liceo Enriques 
 T – Scuola Media Micali Tesei 
 XI – Scuola Media Bartolena – Via Bois

Suburban routes
ATL managed the following Interurban routes as February 2005:

 11 – Pisa – Marina di Pisa – Tirrenia – Calambrone – Livorno
 12 – Pisa – San Piero – Tombolo – Livorno
 21 – Livorno – Rosignano Solvay –  Vada – Cecina
 22 – Livorno Industriale – Collesalvetti – Santa Luce – Cecina
 31 – Collesalvetti – Vicarello – Guasticce – Stagno – Livorno
 32 – Livorno – Nugola – Parrane – Colognole
 33 – Castelnuovo Misericordia – Gabbro – Livorno
 41 – Castellina – Santa Luce – Lorenzana – Collesalvetti
 42 – Castellina – Rosignano Solvay – Cecina
 43 – Rosignano Marittimo – Rosignano Solvay – Cecina
 43b – Nibbiaia – Castelnuovo – Rosignano Marittimo – Ospedale Cecina
 51 – Cecina – California – Casale – Bibbona – Cecina
 52 – Riparbella – San Pietro in Palazzi – Cecina
 61 – Cecina – San Vincenzo – Venturina – Piombino

ATL ProntoBus
ATL ProntoBus service was available on the entire urban network of the local public transport, calling a toll-free telephone number was possible to book a bus ride starting from the chosen bus stop to the desired destination.  
ProntoBus was a complementary, alternative and flexible booking accord to improve the service in some areas as: Castell'Anselmo, Cecina, Collinaia, Colognole, Collesalvetti, Monterotondo, Nugola, Parrana San Giusto, Parrana San Martino, Port of Livorno e Maritime Station.

Montenero funicular

The plan to build the Montenero funicular, in order to link lower Montenero to the Sanctuary situated on the highest part of the hill, date back to June 1907 when was presented a project by the Società Livornese di Trazione Elettrica. The funicular was inaugurated on 19 August 1908 and was integrated by a tram line connecting the lower station to the city center.

Since 1972 the control of the plant passed, through the years, to several management as Comune di Livorno, ATAM, ATL, CTT Nord and finally Autolinee Toscane. It was then decided to carry out a general plan of improvement by replacing the old and heavy cable railway with lighter ones and changing completely the power plant. In 1990 the funicular was completely automated while in 2000 was installed a photovoltaic power supply, the only one in the world applied to a funicular. 

The Montenero funicular has a transport capacity of 580 people per hour and has a user base of 250,000 passengers a year.

See also
 Bus
 Public transport
 List of funicular railways

References

External links 
 

Transport companies of Italy
Public transport in Italy
Italian companies established in 1996
Companies based in Tuscany
Bus companies of Italy
Transport in Livorno
Italy
Bus transport in Italy